Amy Cripps Vernon (née Young; 18 Dec 1869 – 2 August 1956) was an English author of children's books, which were published in the early part of the 20th century. Many of her books were published by the Christian Knowledge Society (later the Society for Promoting Christian Knowledge), and provided moral instruction that reflected the era in which she lived.

Her father, Thomas Grant Young (1843-1897), and her husband, Thomas Pallister Barkas Vernon (1859 - 22 Feb 1900), were both ministers in the Catholic Apostolic Church.

Works

 Thoughts and Dreamings (1896, as 'Amy Cripps Young')
 Short Tales for the Nursery
 Short Stories for Little People
 Sisha (1906)
 Gerald's Chum (1908)
 Little Sir Galahad (1909)
 Bennie's Boy (1910)
 Half-a-Dozen Cousins
 Betty and Priscillia (1913)
 Colin and Joan (1914)
 Derek's Hero (1914)
 Geoffrey (1915)

References

External links

 Books at the British Library
 'Thoughts and Dreamings' at the British Library

1869 births
1956 deaths
English children's writers
British women children's writers
19th-century English women writers
19th-century British writers
20th-century English women writers
20th-century English writers